Salvatore Sandomenico (born 11 January 1990) is an Italian football midfielder. He plays for Nocerina.

Career
On 28 July 2016, he joined Juve Stabia.

On 30 September 2019, he signed a two-year contract with Serie C club Cavese. On 31 January 2020, he joined Avellino on loan.

On 8 August 2020 he moved to Turris.

On 9 February 2021 he signed with Serie D club Nocerina.

References

External links
 

1990 births
Footballers from Naples
Living people
Italian footballers
Association football midfielders
A.S. Gubbio 1910 players
L'Aquila Calcio 1927 players
S.S. Juve Stabia players
U.S. Viterbese 1908 players
S.S. Teramo Calcio players
Reggina 1914 players
Cavese 1919 players
U.S. Avellino 1912 players
A.S.D. Nocerina 1910 players
Serie C players
Serie D players